Sandunguera may refer to:
Sandunguera (album), 1986 album by Los Van Van
"Por encima del nivel" aka "Sandunguera", 1986 song by Los Van Van
"Sandunguera" (bolero), 1943 song by Marcelino Guerra recorded by Arsenio Rodríguez and others
"Sandunguera" (Elena Madera song), 1961
"Sandunguera" (Guaco song), 1979
"Sandunguera" (Rafael Muñoz song), 1941 guaracha written by Juan Torres Manzano
"Chinita sandunguera", 1919 canción by Manuel Corona
"La mujer sandunguera", 1912 political song by Sindo Garay
"La negrita sandunguera", 1958 merengue by Bienvenido Fabián recorded by Celia Cruz
"La sandunguera cubana", 1913 rumba by Alberto Villalón
"Mulata sandunguera" (Guillermo Anckermann song), 1914 guaracha by Guillermo Anckermann
"Mulata sandunguera" (Floro Zorrilla song), 1918 canción by Floro Zorrilla
"Mulata sandunguera" (Juan de la Cruz song), 1940 guaracha by Juan de la Cruz
La Sandunguera, a 2018 EP by Nathy Peluso

See also
La Sandunga